Dundanakoppa is a village in Belgaum district in the southern state of Karnataka, India. The population is 527.

References

Villages in Belagavi district